Pakistan & Gulf Economist is a weekly business magazine published from Karachi, covering the business and economy of Pakistan and the neighbouring Gulf region. 

It was established in 1977 and has been regularly published ever since. It is considered one of the leading business magazines of Pakistan for over 35 years.

References

External links
 Pakistan & Gulf Economist website

1977 establishments in Pakistan
Magazines established in 1977
Mass media in Karachi
Business magazines published in Pakistan
Weekly magazines published in Pakistan
English-language magazines published in Pakistan